Martin Raul Vilallonga (born 8 October 1970) is a former Argentine footballer.

He played the majority of his career in Argentina, where he played for the two Avellaneda rivals Independiente and Racing Club.
He also played in Mexico for Toros Neza and Club León and in Peru for Universitario de Deportes.

Vilallonga also had a brief spell in Japan with Avispa Fukuoka.

Club statistics

Honours
Argentine Clausura 1994
Peruvian Apertura 2002

References

External links

 Sports Ya profile   
 Argentine Primera statistics  

1970 births
Living people
Sportspeople from Mendoza Province
Argentine footballers
Club Atlético Independiente footballers
Estudiantes de La Plata footballers
Racing Club de Avellaneda footballers
Club Atlético Lanús footballers
Club Universitario de Deportes footballers
Arsenal de Sarandí footballers
Instituto footballers
J1 League players
Avispa Fukuoka players
Club León footballers
Toros Neza footballers
Argentine Primera División players
Peruvian Primera División players
Argentine expatriate footballers
Expatriate footballers in Mexico
Expatriate footballers in Peru
Expatriate footballers in Japan
Association football forwards